Zafarobod is an urban-type settlement in Jizzakh Region, Uzbekistan. It is the administrative center of Zafarobod District.

References

Populated places in Jizzakh Region
Urban-type settlements in Uzbekistan